Rene Kokk (born 4 March 1980) is an Estonian politician. He served as Minister of the Environment in the second cabinet of Prime Minister Jüri Ratas from 29 April 2019 to 7 November 2020. Rain Epler was appointed as his successor. He is affiliated with the Conservative People's Party of Estonia (EKRE).

References 

1980 births
21st-century Estonian politicians
Conservative People's Party of Estonia politicians
Environment ministers of Estonia
Estonian University of Life Sciences alumni
Government ministers of Estonia
Living people
Members of the Riigikogu, 2019–2023
Members of the Riigikogu, 2023–2027
Place of birth missing (living people)
People from Rapla